Vilho Henrik Lampi (19 July 1898 – 17 March 1936) was a Finnish painter who is best known for his self-portraits and paintings of Liminka and the people who lived there.

History
Lampi was born in Oulu but lived in Liminka for most of his life. He studied at the Finnish Academy of Fine Arts from 1921 to 1925 and after finishing his studies he returned to Liminka, where he lived and painted his most famous works.

Lampi committed suicide on 17 March 1936 by jumping from a bridge to Oulujoki while visiting in Oulu.

Literature 
 Unto Immonen: Vilho Lampi, lakeuden melankoolikko in Suomen taiteen vuosikirja 1956–1957, Porvoo, 1957. 
 Paavo Rintala: Jumala on kauneus, (novel about Vilho Lampi) Otava, 1959. 
 Eeli Aalto: Vilho Lampi, lakeuden maalari : esittelyä ja taustaa, Arvi A. Karisto, Hämeenlinna, 1967. 
 Marja Junttila et al.: Vilho Lampi 1898–1936, ARS Nordica & Kustannus Pohjoinen, 1998

Films 
 Eeli Aalto: Vilho Lampi, Lakeuden maalari, 1966.
 Hannu Heikinheimo: Jumala on kauneus, 1985.

Plays 
 Kaija Viinikainen: Jumala on kauneus, Kajaanin kaupunginteatteri, 1981.
 Kristian Smeds: Jumala on kauneus, Teatteri Takomo, 2000 and Finnish National Theatre, 2008.
 Taisto Reimaluoto: Tässä on elämä, Kajaanin Runoviikko, 2001.

Gallery

See also
 Finnish art

References

External links 

Vilho Lampi Oulu City Art Museum 
Vilho Lampi's works, Finnish National Gallery 
Vilho Lampi Biografiakeskus 
Vilho Lampi on artnet 
Vilho Lampi Auction Sales and Art Market Information artprice.com 

1898 births
1936 deaths
People from Oulu
People from Oulu Province (Grand Duchy of Finland)
20th-century Finnish painters
Painters who committed suicide
Suicides by jumping in Finland
1936 suicides